Gyan Bahadur Yakthumba Limbu (16 March 1920 – 1 March 1970) was a Nepali police officer and diplomat. He joined the Nepali Police with the rank of Major and was promoted to the rank of Inspector General of Nepal Police, after succeeding Nara Shumsher J.B.R. as the police chief.  He served as the Inspector General of the Nepalese Police force from December 1953 to August 1956. He was the third chief of Nepal Police, and after retirement served as an envoy to Burma.

The present Gyanodaya Bal Batika School in Kathmandu, Nepal, was built in 1975 in memory of him by his wife Indira Yakthumba.

References

Inspectors General of Police (Nepal)
Envoys of Nepal to Burma
Ambassadors of Nepal to Myanmar
Nepalese police officers
1920 births
1970 deaths